Xihuangcun station is a station on Line 6 of the Beijing Subway. The station is located at the intersection of Tiancun Road and North China University of Technology in Shijingshan District. It was opened on December 30, 2018.

Station Layout 
The station has an underground island platform.

Exits 
There are 3 exits, lettered A, B, and C. Exits A and C are accessible.

References

External links 
Beijing Subway official map, showing official English name

Beijing Subway stations in Shijingshan District
Railway stations in China opened in 2018